Greenwood is a small rural hamlet within the city of Pickering in Ontario, Canada.

History 

Originally known as Norwood, in 1852 the community was renamed after Frederick Green from March in the Isle of Ely (now Cambridgeshire), England, who had bought a mill here.

As a young boy John Diefenbaker (1895-1979), prime minister of Canada, attended Greenwood School where his father briefly taught.

Greenwood developed as an unincorporated community within the Pickering Township. When the Regional Municipality of Durham was created in 1974, the southern part of Greenwood was merged with Ajax, and the rest of the territory remained with the Township's successor, the town (later city) of Pickering. "South Greenwood" now exists as a neighbourhood within Ajax. The Greenwood Conservation Area is divided between Ajax and Pickering, and is owned by the Toronto and Region Conservation Authority (TRCA).

The Pickering Museum Village is located on 6th Concession Road in Greenwood. This is the largest history museum in Durham Region with 18 heritage buildings.

References

External links
Greenwood Recreation Association
Pickering Museum Village

Communities in the Regional Municipality of Durham